Braynard Ontawyn Brown (born March 26, 1977) is a former American football wide receiver who played one season with the Cleveland Browns of the National Football League. He played college football at the University of Notre Dame and attended St. Thomas Aquinas High School in Fort Lauderdale, Florida.

References

External links
Just Sports Stats
College stats
NFL Draft Scout

Living people
1977 births
Players of American football from Fort Lauderdale, Florida
American football wide receivers
St. Thomas Aquinas High School (Florida) alumni
Notre Dame Fighting Irish football players
Cleveland Browns players